Morkel is a surname. Notable people with the surname include:

Albie Morkel (born 1981), South African cricketer and older   brother of Morne Morkel.
Denys Morkel (1906–1980), South African cricketer
Dougie Morkel (1885–1950), South African rugby union player
Gerald Morkel (1941–2018), South African politician
Harry Morkel (1888–1956), South African rugby union player
Jacky Morkel (1890–1916), South African rugby union player
John Morkel (1928-2010), South African born Rhodesian rugby union player
Morné Morkel (born 1984), South African cricketer and younger brother of Albie Morkel.

Afrikaans-language surnames